The 1979–80 Cincinnati Bearcats men's basketball team represented the University of Cincinnati during the 1979–80 NCAA men's basketball season.

Roster

Schedule

|-
!colspan=12 style=|Metro Tournament

References 

Cincinnati Bearcats men's basketball seasons
Cincinnati Bearcats Basketball
Cincinnati Bearcats Basketball
Cincinnati Bearcats